Dumfries House (Scottish Gaelic: Taigh Dhùn Phris) is a Palladian country house located in the town of Cumnock in East Ayrshire, Scotland. Noted for being one of the few such houses with much of its original 18th-century furniture still present, including specially commissioned Thomas Chippendale pieces, the house and estate is now owned by The Prince's Foundation, a charity which maintains it as a visitor attraction and hospitality and wedding venue. Both the house and the gardens are listed as significant aspects of Scottish heritage.

The estate and an earlier house were originally called Lefnoreis or Lochnorris, owned by a branch of the Craufurds of Loudoun. The present house was built in the 1750s for William Dalrymple, 5th Earl of Dumfries, by John Adam and Robert Adam. Having been inherited by the 2nd Marquess of Bute in 1814, it remained in his family until 2007 when the 7th Marquess sold it, after three years of uncertainty, due to the cost of upkeep.

Due to its significance and the risk of the furniture collection being distributed and auctioned in 2007 the estate and its entire contents was purchased for £45m for the country by a consortium headed by the Prince of Wales (later King Charles III) including a £20m loan from the Prince's charitable trust. The intention was to renovate the estate to become self-sufficient, both to preserve it and regenerate the local economy. As well as donors and sponsorship, funding was also intended to come from constructing the nearby housing development of Knockroon, a planned community along the lines of the Prince's similar venture, Poundbury in Dorset.

The house duly reopened in 2008, equipped for public tours. Since then various other parts of the estate have been reopened for various uses, to provide both education and employment, as well as funding the trust's running costs. The then Prince of Wales was in residence at the estate on 8 September 2022, when his mother, Queen Elizabeth II, became gravely ill; he was transported by helicopter to Balmoral Castle, where she died later the same day.

Designations
The house is a category A listed building, described by Historic Environment Scotland as "an exceptionally fine and unspoilt Adam mansion". The grounds of the house are included in the Inventory of Gardens and Designed Landscapes in Scotland, the national listing of significant gardens and parks.

History

Lochnorris estate
Originally the estate was known as Lefnoreis or Lochnorris, and belonged to a branch of Craufurds of Loudoun. The original castle stood on the elevated ground close to the coach house.

Earl of Dumfries
In 1635, the estate was purchased from the Craufords by William Crichton, 2nd Earl of Dumfries (1598–1691). The estate, and the title, passed via his daughter to his grandson William Dalrymple-Crichton, 5th Earl of Dumfries and 4th Earl of Stair (1699–1768). He commissioned the Adam brothers to design a new house for the estate.

Dumfries House was designed and built between 1754 and 1759, by Scottish architects John and Robert Adam, although the style of the house is more in keeping with John Adam's other work. Robert Adam oversaw construction until his departure on the "Grand Tour" of Europe. As such it represents an early independent work by the Adam Brothers, who had taken over the architecture business of their father William Adam on his death in 1748. The house is a Palladian design, with a three-storey central block connected to smaller pavilions by linking wings. A master mason who worked as a contractor at Dumfries House was James Armour, father-in-law of the poet Robert Burns.

Marquess of Bute

In 1814, Dumfries House was inherited, along with the earldom of Dumfries, by John Crichton-Stuart, 2nd Marquess of Bute, and the property remained in the Crichton-Stuart family until 2007. In 1885, the 3rd Marquess of Bute commissioned Robert Weir Schultz to design the pavilions. The Crichton-Stuart family retained their main residence at Mount Stuart House on the Isle of Bute. In the later 20th century, the house was lived in by the Dowager Marchioness of Bute, Lady Eileen, until her death in 1993. The 6th Marquess died a few months later, meaning the house passed to her grandson the 7th Marquess, the racing driver known as John Bute (and formerly as Johnny Dumfries).

Intended sale

With John Bute facing a bill from the death duties of both his father and grandmother, he considered selling the house. It was first offered to the National Trust for Scotland in 1994, but they declined. He instead retained the house, later replacing the roof.

In 2004, it was again offered to the National Trust, but by 2007 negotiations had fallen through. In April 2007, it was announced the house would be sold and the contents auctioned separately. The house was scheduled for sale through Savills and its contents for auction by Christie's. It was thought that some of the art and furniture might fetch nearly as much as the house itself; one Chippendale rosewood bookcase, for example, was valued at £2m-£4m.

With the announcement of the sale, preservationists lamented the imminent dispersal of an ensemble said to have remained virtually untouched since an 1803 inventory, and organised a campaign intending to buy the house and hold it in trust under the Save Britain's Heritage organisation. With the funding the campaign managed to raise still falling short, a sale via the auction route looked inevitable after Historic Scotland announced in May 2007 that they would not financially back the campaign.

Charity ownership

The estate was finally purchased as a whole after Charles, Prince of Wales (later Charles III) heard about the campaign from the writer and campaign member James Knox, who  made "an impassioned impromptu speech" at one of the Prince's bi-annual conservation conferences at Holyrood House in Edinburgh. On 27 June 2007, it was announced that a consortium headed by the Prince, and including various heritage charities and the Scottish Government (who contributed £5m), had raised £45 million to purchase the house and contents (along with its roughly  estate) and endow a trust for maintaining it.

The trust was set up with the name "The Great Steward of Scotland's Dumfries House Trust", a reference to the title Great Steward of Scotland then held by Charles in his role as Scottish heir apparent. A major element of the financial package was a £20m loan backed by The Prince's Charities Foundation. It was reported that the contents of the house had already been removed, and were being transported to London when the sale was agreed.

The trust's intended model is to have the estate become a self-sufficient enterprise, in the process revitalising the local economy. The project was to be achieved through donation and sponsorship of various renovation projects around the estate, as well as through revenues from the construction of an 'eco-village' in the grounds, a planned community called Knockroon.

In 2008, the advent of the global financial crisis had a major impact on the project, affecting the prospects for the Knockroon development and thus the recouping of the £20m loan. The Prince faced much media criticism for putting the Foundation's other projects at risk for what was seen as a vanity project, prompting a response in 2010 describing the risk as "manageable and fully covered." After  switching to a model of private and corporate fund raising, the £20m loan was repaid by 2012, with a further £15m backing having been raised for the various renovation projects and ongoing maintenance bill for the estate.

Following restoration, Dumfries House itself opened to the public for guided tours on 6 June 2008. From mid-2009, supermarket chain Morrisons began funding the restoration of the meat and dairy farm attached to the estate, both to become a research and education tool into sustainable farming methods, but also with the intention of its becoming profitable by 2014, part of the chain's vertically integrated supply chain. Renovation of the former coach house and associated stable block began in winter 2010. It reopened in 2011 as a catering facility, as both a visitor cafe and bistro dining facility. The first phase of the Knockroon village opened in May 2011.

In October 2011, work was started on clearing the area that used to be the Walled Garden, which had fallen into disuse and become overgrown. In April 2012, the six-bedroomed guest house Dumfries House Lodge opened, to provide guest accommodation for wedding parties and other events. It was created by renovating a derelict farm building on the estate. The estate's former water-powered sawmill has been renovated to full working order, and with the addition of a larger workshop building, has re-opened as the Sawmill Building Skills Centre, a traditional skills education facility.

King Charles, while Prince of Wales and known in Scotland as the Duke of Rothesay, continued to support Dumfries House. In September 2012, with Camilla, then the Duchess of Rothesay and known as the Duchess of Cornwall, and Alex Salmond, then the First Minister of Scotland, Charles attended Ladies' Day at Ayr Racecourse in aid of the Trust.

In 2017, the Prince of Wales celebrated 10 years of Dumfries house; he was quoted in Dumfries House Magazine  as saying, "We now have over 150 employees and thousands of individuals using the estate. My hope, therefore, is that this publication can help to involve a wider audience of supporters by providing an insight to all that happens on this estate and to its even more important outreach work."

In May 2018, "The Great Steward of Scotland's Dumfries House Trust" was renamed "The Prince's Foundation".

In 2019, the BBC reported that The Prince's Charities Foundation had accepted $202,000 in donations from Quantus Division Ltd, a company that was part of an offshore network managed by Ruben Vardanyan's Moscow investment bank Troika Dialog that moved billions out of Russia. Money from the network was used to help with restoring parts of Dumfries House. Vardanyan stated that any donations to the Prince's Charities Foundation were from his personal funds.

In October 2022, the King featured in a special edition of the BBC TV programme The Repair Shop filmed at Dumfries House, sharing objects from the collection in need of restoration. In January 2023, it was reported that Dumfries House would be open to the public as a part of an initiative by the Prince's Foundation to tackle loneliness and isolation in cold weather by providing warm spaces.

Gallery

Education 
Dumfries House is home to several separate education centres where school pupils can visit to learn about topics ranging from science, technology, engineering and maths (STEM) to farming and gardening. Education programs are linked into the Scottish Curriculum for Excellence and offer pupils from the surrounding Ayrshires, Dumfries and Galloway, Glasgow and Lanarkshire an opportunity to learn about future careers and learn new skills.

Centres are open year-round to primary schools and secondary schools.

See also
 Terringzean Castle, a ruin within the Dumfries House estate

References

Sources and external links 

 
 Dumfries House Sunny Images and Interesting History
 
 
 
 
 
 

Houses completed in 1759
Listed houses in Scotland
Category A listed buildings in East Ayrshire
Charles III
Inventory of Gardens and Designed Landscapes
Robert Adam buildings
H
Historic house museums in East Ayrshire
Country houses in East Ayrshire